The Talang Satang National Park is a national park in Kuching Division, Sarawak, Malaysia. It is Sarawak's first marine protected area, and covers the four islands Pulau Talang-Talang Besar, Pulau Talang-Talang Kecil, Pulau Satang Besar and Pulau Satang Kecil and surrounding coral reefs.

The park was established to protect marine turtles; four species of marine turtles are known to nest in the park, including green turtles and hawksbill turtles.

Although turtles come ashore all year round, the main nesting season is from April to October.

Talang Satang is open to nature tourism although its primary purpose is nature conservation. Activities that visitors can engage in are scubadiving and snorkeling, but only outside the area of protection and conservation.

See also
 List of national parks of Malaysia

References

External links
 Talang-Satang National Park - Sarawak Tourism Board

Kuching Division
National parks of Sarawak